Williams Daniel Velásquez Reyes (born 22 April 1997) is a Venezuelan footballer who plays as a defender for Universidad Central on loan from Watford.

International career
Velásquez was called up to the Venezuela under-20 side for the 2017 FIFA U-20 World Cup.

Career statistics

Club

Honours
Venezuela U20
FIFA U-20 World Cup: Runner-up 2017
South American Youth Football Championship: Third Place 2017

References

External links

1997 births
Living people
Venezuelan footballers
Venezuelan expatriate sportspeople in England
Venezuelan expatriate sportspeople in Spain
Venezuelan expatriate sportspeople in Japan
Association football defenders
Estudiantes de Caracas players
Watford F.C. players
Real Valladolid Promesas players
CE Sabadell FC footballers
JEF United Chiba players
Portland Timbers 2 players
Venezuelan Primera División players
Segunda División B players
J2 League players
Expatriate footballers in Spain